Varsha Nair (born 1957) is an Indian artist born in Kampala, Uganda. 

She was trained in Maharaja Sayajirao University of Baroda and moved to Bangkok in 1995 after relocating from India to England and back. Her work explores the concepts of displacement, home and belonging. She is one of the co-founders of Womanifesto, a feminist art collective and a biennial program that was active in Thailand between 1997 and 2008, which has created an international artist-led exchange platform in Thailand. Her work has been exhibited in numerous art institutions, including Tate Modern (London), Haus der Kulturen der Welt (Berlin), Fondazione Sandretto Re Rebaudengo (Turin), Art in General (New York), Sarajevo Centre of Contemporary Art (Sarajevo), Experimenta Media Arts (Melbourne), LaSalle-SIA College of the Arts, Devi Art Foundation (New Delhi), and The Guild Art Gallery (Mumbai). She has published her articles in several arts publications, such as n.paradoxa, Southeast of Now: Directions in Contemporary and Modern Art in Asia, ArtAsiaPacific, and Ctrl+P Journal of Contemporary Art. Nair is currently based in Baroda.

Artworks 
In 2006, Nair staged a series of live interventions titled Encounter(s), performed at the Turbine hall in Tate Modern. She collaborated with Tejal Shah (of Mumbai) to develop these interventions, in which the artists wore white embroidered straitjackets, connected to each other by the absurdly long sleeves, and lay claim to the vast architectural Turbine Hall. This work was also performed in numerous other locations, including the National Review of Live Art festival in Glasgow and the Palazzo Carignano in Turin, Italy.

Her work Undercurrent Yangon from 2014 was performed at the People's Park in Yangon, Myanmar. Vasha Nair also participated in the 2nd Beyond Pressure International Festival of Performance Art in Yangon in 2009.

References 

Indian installation artists
Living people
Ugandan women artists
People from Kampala
1957 births